Adhik Ravichandran is an Indian film director, actor and writer who works in Tamil cinema. He made his directorial debut with the comedy film Trisha Illana Nayanthara (2015).

Filmography

As an actor

References

External links
 

Living people
Tamil film directors
Tamil screenwriters
1986 births